The Morgartenberg (1,244 m) is a mountain of the Schwyzer Alps, located west of Rothenthurm in the canton of Schwyz and overlooking Lake Ägeri on its west side. The border with the canton of Zug runs west of the mountains.

References

External links
Morgartenberg on Hikr

Mountains of the canton of Schwyz
Mountains of the Alps
Mountains of Switzerland